Catherine Boura (Aikaterini Boura) is a Greek diplomat who has served as the country's Permanent Representative to the United Nations since 2015.

Early life and education
Boura was born in Athens. She has a bachelor's degree in literature from the National and Kapodistrian University of Athens, a master's degree in history from the School of Slavonic and East European Studies and a PhD in history from London University.

Career
Boura joined the diplomatic services in 1983, working for the Department of European Union Common Foreign and Security Policy and then the Policy Planning and Early Warning Unit of the Council of the European Union in Brussels from 1999 until 2002. From 2004 until 2007 she was Greece's Consul General in New York.

Boura worked in the Ministry of Foreign Affairs as Director of the Department for European Countries from 2008 to 2009 and Chief of Protocol from 2009 until 2011. She was ambassador to Lebanon from 2011 until 2015. She was appointed as Permanent Representative of Greece to the United Nations on 10 March 2015. In December 2015, she introduced a resolution entitled "Return or Restitution of Cultural Property to the Countries of Origin".

Publications

Awards and honours
 James Jay Dudley Luce Foundation Global Citizenship Award, 2016

References

External links
 Permanent Mission of Greece to the United Nations profile

Living people
Diplomats from Athens
National and Kapodistrian University of Athens alumni
Alumni of the UCL School of Slavonic and East European Studies
Greek women ambassadors
Ambassadors of Greece to Lebanon
Permanent Representatives of Greece to the United Nations
Year of birth missing (living people)